The Nobel Prize is an annual, international prize first awarded in 1901 for achievements in Physics, Chemistry, Physiology or Medicine, Literature, and Peace, with an associated prize in Economics awarded since 1969. As of November 2022, Nobel Prizes had been awarded to 954 individuals, of whom 17 were Latin American recipients (1.7% of the 954 individual recipients).

Latin Americans have received awards in three of the six award categories: six in Literature (35.3% of the Latin recipients), six in Peace (35.3%), three in Physiology or Medicine (17.6%), and two in Chemistry (11.8%). The first Latin American recipient, Carlos Saavedra Lamas, was awarded the Peace Prize in 1936. The most recent, Juan Manuel Santos, was awarded the Peace Prize in 2016.

Among the Latin American laureates, two served as heads of state or government of their respective countries upon receiving the Nobel Prize. Those include Óscar Arias Sánchez of Costa Rica and Juan Manuel Santos of Colombia, who were presidents; both of them were awarded the Peace Prize.

Chemistry
Two Latin Americans have been given the Nobel Prize in Chemistry.

Literature
Six Latin Americans have been given the Nobel Prize in Literature.

Peace
Six Latin Americans have been given the Nobel Peace Prize.

Physiology or Medicine
Three Latin Americans have been given the Nobel Prize in Physiology or Medicine.

See also
 List of Argentine Nobel laureates
 List of Spanish Nobel laureates
 List of Asian Nobel laureates
 List of Jewish Nobel laureates
 List of Muslim Nobel laureates

References

Latin American people
Latino
Latin America-related lists